Amargarh Assembly constituency (Sl. No.: 106) is a Punjab Legislative Assembly constituency in Malerkotla district, Punjab state, India.

Members of the Legislative Assembly

Election results

2022

2017

2012

See also 
Punjab Legislative Assembly

References

External links
 

Assembly constituencies of Punjab, India
Sangrur district
Amritsar district